Auggie Smith (born 1970) is an American comedian.  His real first name is Kevin.

Born in Santa Rosa, California, he was raised in Billings, Montana. He lives in Los Angeles, CA.

He is a frequent guest on the Bob and Tom Show, a nationally syndicated radio program, and tours across the country steadily. His television appearances include Last Comic Standing in 2007 and Comedy Central's "Live At Gotham" (2006).

In 2010, he became the first comedian to win both the San Francisco and Seattle Comedy Competitions in the same year.  Comics who won only one of these include Mitch Hedberg, Dana Carvey, Sinbad, and Jake Johannsen. (Robin Williams, Ellen DeGeneres and Dane Cook placed second in the San Francisco Competition).

Notable appearances
Seattle Comedy Contest 2010 - won
San Francisco Comedy Festival 2010 - won
Aspen Rooftop Comedy Festival, 2008 (won Club Favorite award) 
Montreal Comedy Festival (1998)
Bob and Tom Comedy All Stars Tour (2007-8)

References

External links

 Official web page
 
 
 
 

1970 births
Living people
People from Billings, Montana
People from Portland, Oregon
People from Santa Rosa, California
American male comedians
Comedians from California
Comedians from New York City
Comedians from Oregon
21st-century American comedians